The 2022 Iowa Attorney General election took place on November 8, 2022, to elect the Attorney General of Iowa. Incumbent Democratic Attorney General Tom Miller, who was first elected Attorney General in 1978, ran for re-election to an eleventh term  but was narrowly defeated by Republican nominee Brenna Bird, the county attorney for Guthrie County. Bird received 51% of the vote while Miller received 49% of the vote.

Democratic primary

Candidates

Nominee
Tom Miller, incumbent attorney general

Results

Republican primary

Candidates

Nominee
Brenna Bird, Guthrie County attorney (2018–present) and nominee for attorney general in 2010

Results

General election

Predictions

Polling 
Graphical summary

Results

Notes

Partisan clients

See also
Attorney General of Iowa

References

External links
Official campaign websites
Brenna Bird (R) for Attorney General
Tom Miller (D) for Attorney General

Attorney General
Iowa
Iowa Attorney General elections